Edward Charles "Ted" Row (26 March 1923 – 4 July 2007) was an Australian politician.

Early life 
Row was born in Ingham to Edward Dunlop Row and Ida Jesse, née Kilpatrick. He was educated at Trebonne State School and then Queensland Agricultural High School.

Politics 
A canegrower, he served on Hinchinbrook Shire Council from 1962 to 1972. In 1972 he was elected to the Queensland Legislative Assembly as the National Party member for Hinchinbrook, succeeding his uncle, John Row. Although he never sat on the front bench, he did serve as Chairman of Committees from 1983. Row continued as an MP until his retirement in 1989.

Later life 
Row died in Oxley in 2007 and was buried in Brookfield Cemetery.

References

1923 births
2007 deaths
National Party of Australia members of the Parliament of Queensland
Members of the Queensland Legislative Assembly
20th-century Australian politicians